Lesley Ann Taylor is an Australian lawyer and judge of the Supreme Court of Victoria. She was appointed in 2018 after twenty years experience in
criminal law and human rights.

References 

Living people
Judges of the Supreme Court of Victoria
Australian King's Counsel
Lawyers from Melbourne
Australian women lawyers
Year of birth missing (living people)